Ding Xuesong (丁雪松; born Chongqing May 27, 1918  –  May 29, 2011) was China's first female ambassador in 1979. She was ambassador to the Netherlands 1979–1981, then to Denmark and Iceland 1982–1984. She was married to Korean-born composer Zheng Lücheng. She accompanied him to North Korea in 1945, but appealed to Zhou Enlai to request Kim Il Sung's permission for them to return to China in 1950.

As Ambassador to Denmark Ding was instrumental in Carlsberg Brewery's investment in the Beijing Huadu Brewery, at the time China's most modern.

References

1918 births
2011 deaths
Ambassadors of China to Denmark
Ambassadors of China to the Netherlands
Ambassadors of China to Iceland
People's Republic of China politicians from Chongqing
Chinese Communist Party politicians from Chongqing
Chinese women diplomats
Chinese women ambassadors
Burials at Babaoshan Revolutionary Cemetery